Konstantinos "Kostas" Kaimakoglou (born on March 15, 1983) is a Greek former professional basketball player who last played for UNICS Kazan of the VTB United League and the EuroCup. He is 2.05 m (6'9") tall, and his main position is power forward, but he can also play as a small ball center if needed.

Professional career
Kaimakoglou began his professional career with the Greek League club Near East during the 2002–03 season. In 2004, he moved to the Greek club Maroussi. He was named to the Greek League Best Five in 2010. He joined the Greek club Panathinaikos in July 2010. With Panathinaikos, Kaimakoglou won the EuroLeague and Greek League championships in 2011. He also won the Greek Cup title with Panathinaikos in 2012.

In July 2012, he signed a two-year contract with the Russian VTB United League club UNICS Kazan, at an amount of 2.4 million euros net income. In July 2014, he extended his contract with UNICS for two more years. On June 12, 2016, he re-signed with UNICS for one more season. Kaimakoglu averaged 4.6 points, 3.3 rebounds and 1.5 assists per game during the 2019–20 season. He re-signed with the team on September 19, 2020. On September 10, 2021, Kaimakoglou announced his retirement from professional basketball.

National team career
Kaimakoglou won the gold medal at the 2002 FIBA Europe Under-20 Championship as a member of the Greek Under-20 junior national team. He also played at the 2005 World University Games with Greece's junior national team. He also played with the senior men's Greek national team.

He won the bronze medal at the 2009 EuroBasket, and he also played with Greece at the 2010 FIBA World Championship, the 2011 EuroBasket, the 2012 FIBA World Olympic Qualifying Tournament, the 2013 EuroBasket, the 2014 FIBA World Cup, and the 2015 EuroBasket.

Career statistics

EuroLeague

|-
| style="text-align:left;"| 2009–10
| style="text-align:left;"| Marousi
| 15 || 12 || 24.0 || .574 || .326 || .711 || 2.9 || 1.5 || .5 || .2 || 9.6 || 8.5
|-
| style="text-align:left;background:#AFE6BA;"| 2010–11†
| style="text-align:left;" rowspan=2| Panathinaikos
| 18 || 4 || 10.2 || .389 || .353 || .893 || 2.4 || .6 || .6 || .1 || 3.2 || 4.8
|-
| style="text-align:left;"| 2011–12
| 23 || 5 || 22.4 || .460 || .441 || .723 || 4.1 || 1.3 || .9 || .2 || 7.9 || 9.6
|-
| style="text-align:left;"| 2014–15
| style="text-align:left;" rowspan=2| UNICS
| 10 || 10 || 31.0 || .463 || .344 || .667 || 5.1 || 3.6 || 1.5 || .3 || 7.9 || 11.4
|-
| style="text-align:left;"| 2016–17
| 19 || 17 || 23.0 || .488 || .286 || .786 || 3.4 || 1.5 || .5 || .2 || 4.7 || 4.6
|- class="sortbottom"
| align="center" colspan="2"| Career
| 85 || 48 || ? || .491 || .361 || .753 || 3.5 || 1.5 || .7 || .2 || 6.5 || ?

Awards and accomplishments

Pro career
2x Greek League All-Star: (2010, 2011)
Greek League Best: (2010)
EuroLeague Champion: (2011)
Greek League Champion: (2011)
Greek Cup Winner: (2012)
Russian Cup Winner: (2014)

Greek senior national team
2002 FIBA Europe Under-20 Championship: 
2009 EuroBasket:

References

External links
Official Twitter Account
FIBA Profile
Euroleague.net Profile
Eurobasket.com Profile
VTB United League Profile
Greek Basket League Profile 
Draftexpress.com Profile
UNICS Kazan Profile
Basket.gr Profile 
FIBA Article - Kaimakoglou Gets His Due

1983 births
Living people
2010 FIBA World Championship players
2014 FIBA Basketball World Cup players
BC UNICS players
Centers (basketball)
Greek Basket League players
Greek men's basketball players
Maroussi B.C. players
Near East B.C. players
Panathinaikos B.C. players
Power forwards (basketball)
Basketball players from Piraeus